The 61st Pennsylvania House of Representatives District is located in southeast Pennsylvania and has been represented by Liz Hanbidge since 2019.

District Profile 
The 61st  District is located in Montgomery County and includes the following areas:

 Lower Gwynedd Township
 North Wales
 Towamencin Township
 Upper Gwynedd Township
 Whitpain Township (part)
District 01 
District 02 
District 03 
District 04 
District 05 
District 06 
District 07
District 12

Representatives

Recent election results

References

External links 

 District map from the United States Census Bureau
 Pennsylvania House Legislative District Maps from the Pennsylvania Redistricting Commission.
 Population Data for District 61 from the Pennsylvania Redistricting Commission.

Government of Montgomery County, Pennsylvania
61